John McEwan (16 September 1903 – 10 October 1957) was a Scottish footballer who played as a left half. His only club at the professional level was Kilmarnock, where he spent twelve seasons.

He began his career with local junior teams Darvel and Irvine Meadow before joining Kilmarnock in 1923. He quickly became a regular in the side, and was on the field when Killie won the Scottish Cup in 1929 and finished runners-up after a replay in 1932. He made 395 appearances in the cup and Scottish Football League Division One, and visited North America (the club's first tour overseas) in the summer of 1930.

References

1903 births
1957 deaths
Scottish footballers
Footballers from East Ayrshire
Association football wing halves
Kilmarnock F.C. players
Darvel F.C. players
Scottish Junior Football Association players
Irvine Meadow XI F.C. players
Scottish Football League players